The Celtici Supertamarici were an ancient Gallaecian Celtic tribe, living in the west of modern Galicia, in the Xallas's county.

See also
Pre-Roman peoples of the Iberian Peninsula

External links
Detailed map of the Pre-Roman Peoples of Iberia (around 200 BC)

Tribes of Gallaecia
Galician Celtic tribes
Tribes conquered by Rome